Listeria monocytogenes is a gram positive bacterium and causes many food-borne infections such as Listeriosis. This bacteria is ubiquitous in the environment where it can act as either a saprophyte when free living within the environment or as a pathogen when entering a host organism. Many non-coding RNAs have been identified within the bacteria genome where several of these have been classified as novel non-coding RNAs and may contribute to pathogenesis.

Tiling arrays and mutagenesis identified many non-coding RNAs within the L. monocytogenes genome and the location of these non-coding RNAs within the bacterial genome was confirmed by RACE (rapid amplification of cDNA ends) analysis. These studies showed that the expression of many non-coding RNAs was dependent on the environment and that several of these non-coding RNAs act as cis-regulatory elements. Comparisons between previously characterized non-coding RNAs and those present in the L. monocyotogenes genome identified 50 novel non-coding RNAs in L. monocyotogenes. An additional comparative study between the pathogenic L. monocytogenes strain and the non pathogenic L. innocua strain identified several non-coding RNAs that are only present within L. monocytogenes which suggests that these ncRNAs may have a role in pathogenesis. The tables below summarizes the location, flanking genes and also the characteristics of the novel small non-coding RNAs identified and the previously characterized non-coding RNAs present in L. monocytogenes

Novel Non-coding RNAs

aArrows indicate the sense of the gene on the genome. Bold arrows indicate gene absent from L. innocua.

Listeria monocytogenes EGD-e strain was used in these studies EMBL accession AL591824.1

Characterised non-coding RNAs

References

External links
 Rfam database

Listeriaceae
Non-coding RNA